Benton is a local service district and designated place in the Canadian province of Newfoundland and Labrador.

History 
When the railway was constructed in the late 1800s, Benton became a sawmill town. The railroad also made it possible for a handful of mines and quarries (though less well known) able to operate in Central Newfoundland. This included a granite quarry at Benton called Hall's Quarry.

The Newfoundland Railway was constructed between 1881 and 1897. The track arrived in Benton at the end of the 1892 construction season. The first inhabitants of Benton were Railway Section crews. Closely followed by shop keepers, quarry men, loggers and sawmill operators. Issac Penney arrived in Benton in the 1920s and was a section foreman for the railway. Jim Wicks brought his family to Benton in 1939 and was a cook in the logging camps and later ran a general store.

Geography 
Benton is in Newfoundland within Subdivision E of Division No. 6.

Demographics 

Government 
Benton is a local service district (LSD) that is governed by a committee responsible for the provision of certain services to the community. The chair of the LSD committee is Terry Hynes.

See also 
List of communities in Newfoundland and Labrador
List of designated places in Newfoundland and Labrador
List of local service districts in Newfoundland and Labrador

References 

Designated places in Newfoundland and Labrador
Local service districts in Newfoundland and Labrador